The XLR11, company designation RMI 6000C4, was the first liquid-propellant rocket engine developed in the United States for use in aircraft. Each of the four combustion chambers produced  of thrust. The engine was not throttleable but each chamber could be turned on and off individually.

Development
Development of the engine began in 1943. Reaction Motors called the engine "Black Betsy", though informally it was referred to as "The Belching Black Bastard". Its first official designation was the 6000C4, and it was later given the military designation XLR11.

Operational history
The XLR11-RM-5 engine was first used in the Bell X-1. On October 14, 1947, the X-1 became the first aircraft to fly faster than the speed of sound (Mach 1). The XLR11-RM-5 was also used in the X-1A and X-1B, and as a booster engine in the U.S. Navy's D-558-2 Douglas Skyrocket turbojet (where it was designated the XLR8-RM-5).

In 1959 and 1960, while development of a more powerful engine was still under way, a pair of XLR11-RM-13's were used as an interim power plant for the initial flights of the X-15 research aircraft. After 24 powered flights, the XLR11 engines were replaced by the new XLR99 engine in November 1960.

The XLR11-RM-13 was also used in the Dryden lifting bodies, and as a booster engine in the Republic XF-91 Thunderceptor turbojet.

Variants
RMI 6000C4Company designation of the LR11 family.
XLR8-RM-5
XLR8-RM-6 (RMI A6000C4-2)
XLR11-RM-5
XLR11-RM-13

Specifications (XLR11-RM-5)
Data from:Aircraft engines of the World 1959/60

See also
 Bell X-1
 North American X-15
 Northrop M2-F2
 Northrop M2-F3
 Northrop HL-10
 Martin Marietta X-24A
 Martin Marietta X-24B

References

External links
 Reaction Motors XLR11 Rocket – National Museum of the United States Air Force
 Dryden Flight Research Center
 X-Planes at Edwards AFB

 

Aircraft rocket engines